John Conant was an English theologian.

John Conant may also refer to:

John A. Conant, Wisconsin politician
Sir John Ernest Michael Conant, 2nd Baronet (born 1923) of the Conant baronets

See also
Kenneth John Conant, architectural historian
Conant (disambiguation)